"After a Few" is a song co-written and recorded by American country music singer Travis Denning. It is his second single for Mercury Nashville. Denning wrote the song with Kelly Archer and Justin Weaver.

Content and history
Tina Benitez-Eves of American Songwriter describes the song as "a cautious tale about looking for relationships in all the wrong places." Denning said that he wanted the song's message to "capture that story of that frustration and just that moment where you go, God, why can’t I do this? Why can’t I get past this?" The title refers to the progress of such a relationship "after a few" alcoholic drinks.

Charts
"After a Few" set a new record for the longest run on the Billboard Country Airplay chart in May 2020. For the week ending May 9, 2020, it achieved this record when it spent its 60th week on the chart. It peaked at number one on the same chart in its 65th week, also a record for slowest ascent. This record was tied in 2022 by Michael Ray's "Whiskey and Rain".

Weekly charts

Year-end charts

Certifications

References

2019 songs
2019 singles
Mercury Nashville singles
Travis Denning songs
Songs written by Kelly Archer
Songs written by Justin Weaver
Song recordings produced by Jeremy Stover
Songs written by Travis Denning